Daniel Gimeno-Traver is the defending champion, but chose not to defend his title. Gerald Melzer won the title defeating Paolo Lorenzi in the final 6–3, 6–1.

Seeds

Draw

Finals

Top half

Bottom half

References
 Main Draw
 Qualifying Draw

2016 ATP Challenger Tour
2016 Singles